Islam Ramazanovich Makhachev (born 27 October 1991) is a Russian professional mixed martial artist and former Sambo competitor. He currently competes in the Lightweight division in the Ultimate Fighting Championship (UFC), where he is the current UFC Lightweight Champion. A professional competitor since 2010, Makhachev was the combat sambo world champion at 74 kilograms in 2016. As of March 7, 2023, he is #3 in the UFC men's pound-for-pound rankings.

Early life 
An ethnic Lak, Makhachev was born in Makhachkala and grew up in the remote village of Burshi (then part of Dagestan ASSR, Soviet Union, now part of the Republic of Dagestan, Russia), where he trained and competed in combat sambo.

In the 2016 World Combat Sambo Championship, he won a gold medal. In the final match he won 7–0 over Valentin Benishev of Bulgaria.

Mixed martial arts career

M-1 Global
Makhachev made his M-1 Global debut against Tengiz Khuchua on 12 February 2011 and won the fight via KO in the first round.

In his second fight for the promotion, Makhachev faced Mansour Barnaoui, on 9 April 2013 at M-1 Challenge 38. He won via unanimous decision (30–27, 30–27, 30–27).

Makhachev faced undefeated Brazilian Jiu-Jitsu black belt Rander Junio on 21 August 2013 at M-1 Challenge 41. He won via unanimous decision.

Makhachev faced M-1 Global Yuri Ivlev on 7 June 2014 at M-1 Challenge 49. Islam dominated the fight, he softened up Ivlev with punches before finishing the fight by submission via armbar.

On 7 September 2014, in his final bout for M-1 Global before signing with the UFC, Makhachev defeated Ivica Truscek via submission in the third round.

Ultimate Fighting Championship

On 2 October 2014, Makhachev signed a four-fight contract with the UFC. He submitted Leo Kuntz in the second round on 23 May 2015, at UFC 187.

Makhachev faced Adriano Martins on 3 October 2015 at UFC 192. He lost via knockout in the first round, marking his first professional loss.

Makhachev was expected to face Drew Dober on 16 April 2016, at UFC on Fox 19. After the weigh ins, the UFC announced that Makhachev had failed an out-of-competition drug screening, testing positive for the banned anti-ischemic meldonium. The match was cancelled. USADA lifted the suspension of Makhachev after a hearing on 2 July 2016.

On 17 September 2016, he faced with Chris Wade at UFC Fight Night 94. He won the fight via unanimous decision.

Makhachev faced Nik Lentz on 11 February 2017, at UFC 208. He won the fight by unanimous decision (30–27, 30–25, 30–25).

Makhachev was expected to face Michel Prazeres on 2 September 2017 at UFC Fight Night 115. However, Makhachev pulled out of the fight in the beginning of August citing a religious reason, and he was replaced by Mads Burnell.

Makhachev fought Gleison Tibau on 20 January 2018 at UFC 220. He won the fight by knockout in 57 seconds in the first round.

Makhachev faced Kajan Johnson on 28 July 2018 at UFC on Fox 30. Makhachev took Johnson down in the first round, where he worked to mount and secured the armbar, forcing Johnson to tap; giving Makhachev a submission victory.

Makhachev was expected to face Francisco Trinaldo on 26 January 2019 at UFC 233. However, it was reported on 11 November 2018 Makhachev was pulled out from the event due to undisclosed reason and he was replaced by Alexander Hernandez.

Makhachev faced Arman Tsarukyan on 20 April 2019 at UFC on ESPN+ 7. He won the fight via unanimous decision. This win earned him the Fight of the Night award.

Makhachev faced Davi Ramos on 7 September 2019 at UFC 242. He won the fight via unanimous decision.

Makhachev was scheduled to face Alexander Hernandez on 18 April 2020 at UFC 249. However, Makhachev was removed from the card due to travel restrictions related to the COVID-19 pandemic and he was replaced by Omar Morales.

Makhachev was expected to face Rafael dos Anjos on 24 October 2020 at UFC 254.  However, on 8 October 2020 it was reported that  dos Anjos tested positive for COVID-19 and he was removed from the bout. The pairing was left intact and rescheduled for 14 November 2020 at UFC Fight Night: Felder vs. dos Anjos.  However, on 8 November, it was reported that Makhachev was forced to pull from the event due to staph infection.

Makhachev faced Drew Dober on 6 March 2021 at UFC 259. He won the fight by an arm-triangle choke submission in the third round.

Makhachev faced Thiago Moisés on 17 July 2021 at UFC on ESPN 26. He won the fight by a rear-naked choke submission in the fourth round.

A bout with former UFC Lightweight Champion Rafael dos Anjos was rescheduled and was expected to take place on 30 October 2021 at UFC 267. However, dos Anjos was forced to pulled from the event due to injury, and he was replaced by Dan Hooker. He won the fight by a kimura submission in the first round.

Makhachev was scheduled to face Beneil Dariush on 26 February 2022 at UFC Fight Night 202. However, on 12 February 2022 it was reported that Dariush withdrew from the event due to an ankle injury and he was replaced by Bobby Green. He won the bout via ground and pound TKO in the first round.

UFC Lightweight Champion

Makhachev vs. Oliveira 

Makhachev faced Charles Oliveira for the vacant UFC Lightweight Championship at UFC 280 on 22 October 2022. Makhachev won the bout and the title in the second round via arm-triangle choke after knocking down Oliveira with a punch. With this win, he received the Performance of the Night bonus.

In November 2022, Makhachev was awarded Order "For Merit to the Republic of Dagestan" for his achievement in martial arts.

Makhachev vs. Volkanovski 

Makhachev defended his title against the UFC Featherweight Champion Alexander Volkanovski  on 12 February 2023 at UFC 284. Makhachev won the bout via unanimous decision. This fight earned him the Fight of the Night award.

Championships and accomplishments

Mixed martial arts
Ultimate Fighting Championship
 UFC Lightweight Championship (One time, current)
 One successful title defense
 Fight of the Night (Two times) 
 Performance of the Night (One time) 
 Least significant strikes absorbed per minute in UFC Lightweight division history (1.27)
 Tied (Charles Oliveira) for second longest win streak in UFC Lightweight division history (11)
ProFC
ProFC Union National Cup
MMAjunkie.com
2021 March Submission of the Month vs. Drew Dober
2021 October Submission of the Month vs. Dan Hooker
2022 October Submission of the Month vs. Charles Oliveira
2022 Submission of the year vs. Charles Oliveira

Sambo
Fédération Internationale Amateur de Sambo (FIAS)
2016 FIAS World Combat Sambo Championships Gold Medalist
World Combat Sambo Federation (not FIAS)
Combat Sambo World champion
Combat Sambo Federation of Russia
Combat Sambo Russian National champion (four time)
All-Russian
Russian Nationals 2016 champion (World Team Trials-FIAS)

Grappling
UWW Russian Grappling Federation
North Caucasian Federal District 1st

Mixed martial arts record

|-
|Win
|align=center|24–1
|Alexander Volkanovski
|Decision (unanimous)
|UFC 284
|
|align=center|5
|align=center|5:00
|Perth, Australia 
|
|-
|Win
|align=center|23–1
|Charles Oliveira
|Submission (arm-triangle choke)
|UFC 280
|
|align=center|2
|align=center|3:16
|Abu Dhabi, United Arab Emirates
|
|-
|Win
|align=center|22–1
|Bobby Green
|TKO (punches)
|UFC Fight Night: Makhachev vs. Green
|
|align=center|1
|align=center|3:23
|Las Vegas, Nevada, United States
|
|-
|Win
|align=center|21–1
|Dan Hooker 
| Submission (kimura)
|UFC 267 
|
|align=center|1
|align=center|2:25
|Abu Dhabi, United Arab Emirates
|  
|-
|Win
|align=center|20–1
|Thiago Moisés
| Submission (rear-naked choke)
|UFC on ESPN: Makhachev vs. Moisés
|
|align=center|4
|align=center|2:38
|Las Vegas, Nevada, United States
|
|-
|Win
|align=center|19–1
|Drew Dober
| Submission (arm-triangle choke) 
|UFC 259 
|
|align=center|3
|align=center|1:37
|Las Vegas, Nevada, United States
|  
|- 
|Win
|align=center|18–1
|Davi Ramos
| Decision (unanimous)	
|UFC 242 
|
|align=center|3
|align=center|5:00
|Abu Dhabi, United Arab Emirates
|
|-
|Win
|align=center|17–1
|Arman Tsarukyan
|Decision (unanimous)
|UFC Fight Night: Overeem vs. Oleinik 
|
|align=center|3
|align=center|5:00
|Saint Petersburg, Russia
|
|-
|Win
|align=center|16–1
|Kajan Johnson
| Submission (armbar)
|UFC on Fox: Alvarez vs. Poirier 2 
|
|align=center|1
|align=center|4:43
|Calgary, Alberta, Canada
|
|-
|Win
|align=center|15–1
|Gleison Tibau
| KO (punch)
|UFC 220 
|
|align=center|1
|align=center|0:57
|Boston, Massachusetts, United States
|
|-
|Win
|align=center|14–1
|Nik Lentz
| Decision (unanimous)	
|UFC 208
|
|align=center|3
|align=center|5:00
|Brooklyn, New York, United States
| 
|-
|Win
|align=center|13–1
|Chris Wade
| Decision (unanimous)
|UFC Fight Night: Poirier vs. Johnson
|
|align=center|3
|align=center|5:00
|Hidalgo, Texas, United States
|
|-
| Loss
| align=center| 12–1
| Adriano Martins
| TKO (punch)
| UFC 192
| 
| align=center| 1
| align=center| 1:46
| Houston, Texas, United States
| 
|-
| Win
| align=center| 12–0
| Leo Kuntz
| Submission (rear-naked choke)
| UFC 187
| 
| align=center| 2
| align=center| 2:38
| Las Vegas, Nevada, United States
| 
|-
| Win
| align=center| 11–0
| Ivica Trušček 
| Submission (inverted triangle choke)
| M-1 Challenge 51 
| 
| align=center| 3
| align=center| 4:45
| Saint Petersburg, Russia
|
|-
| Win
| align=center| 10–0
| Yuri Ivlev
| Submission (armbar)
| M-1 Challenge 49 
| 
| align=center| 1
| align=center| 1:49
| Ingushetia, Russia
| 
|-
| Win
| align=center| 9–0
| Rander Junio
| Decision (unanimous)
| M-1 Challenge 41
| 
| align=center| 3
| align=center| 5:00
| Saint Petersburg, Russia
| 
|-
| Win
| align=center| 8–0
| Mansour Barnaoui
| Decision (unanimous)
| M-1 Challenge 38 
| 
| align=center| 3
| align=center| 5:00
| Saint Petersburg, Russia
| 
|-
| Win
| align=center| 7–0
| Anatoly Kormilkin
| Submission (armbar)
| Lion's Fights 2 
| 
| align=center| 1
| align=center| 3:17
| Saint Petersburg, Russia
| 
|-
| Win
| align=center| 6–0
| Migel Grigoryan
| Submission (rear-naked choke)
| Siberian Fighting Championship 1
| 
| align=center| 1
| align=center| 4:25
| Tomsk, Russia
| 
|-
| Win
| align=center| 5–0
| Vladimir Egoyan
| Decision (split)
| ProFC: Union Nation Cup Final
| 
| align=center| 2
| align=center| 5:00
| Rostov-on-Don, Russia
| 
|-
| Win
| align=center| 4–0
| Magomed Ibragimov
| Submission (triangle choke)
| Tsumada Fighting Championship 5
| 
| align=center| 2
| align=center| 3:15
| Tsumadinsky, Russia
| 
|-
| Win
| align=center| 3–0
| Martiros Grigoryan
| TKO (punches)
| ProFC: Union Nation Cup 15
| 
| align=center| 1
| align=center| 2:52
| Simferopol, Ukraine
| 
|-
| Win
| align=center| 2–0
| Tengiz Khuchua
| KO (punch)
| M-1 Selection Ukraine 2010: The Finals
| 
| align=center| 1
| align=center| 0:30
| Kyiv, Ukraine
| 
|-
| Win
| align=center| 1–0
| Magomed Bekbolatov
| Decision (unanimous)
| Tsumada Fighting Championship 4
| 
| align=center| 2
| align=center| 5:00
| Tsumadinsky, Russia
|

Pay-per-view bouts

See also
 List of current UFC fighters
 List of male mixed martial artists

References

External links

1991 births
Dagestani mixed martial artists
Living people
Russian Muslims
Russian Sunni Muslims
20th-century Muslims
21st-century Muslims
Sportspeople from Makhachkala
Russian sportspeople in doping cases
Doping cases in mixed martial arts
Russian expatriates in the United States
Russian male mixed martial artists
Russian sambo practitioners
Russian sanshou practitioners
Lightweight mixed martial artists
Laks (Caucasus)
Ultimate Fighting Championship male fighters
Ultimate Fighting Championship champions
Mixed martial artists utilizing sambo
Mixed martial artists utilizing sanshou